Vladimir Kiselev (born November 10, 1974) is a Russian biathlete, cross-country skier, and two-time Paralympic champion. He competes in classification category sitting events.

Career 
Kiselev competed in biathlon and cross-country skiing at the 2006 Winter Paralympics. In biathlon, he took the gold in the men's 12.5 km individual and 7.5 km individual, sitski. In cross-country skiing, he placed 4th in the men's 10 km, 5th in the 15 km, and 6th in the 5 km, sitski. He placed 5th in the men's relay with Alfis Makamedinov and Kirill Mikhaylov.

Kiselev competed at the 2010 Winter Paralympics in cross-country skiing and biathlon. In cross-country skiing, he took the bronze medal in the 1 km sprint. He came in 6th place in the 10 km, sitting. In biathlon, he took the silver medal in the 12.5 km individual, sitting. He placed 4th in the men's 2.4 km pursuit, sitting.

References

External links 
 

Russian male cross-country skiers
Russian male biathletes
Paralympic biathletes of Russia
Paralympic cross-country skiers of Russia
Biathletes at the 2006 Winter Paralympics
Cross-country skiers at the 2006 Winter Paralympics
Biathletes at the 2010 Winter Paralympics
Cross-country skiers at the 2010 Winter Paralympics
Paralympic gold medalists for Russia
Paralympic silver medalists for Russia
Paralympic bronze medalists for Russia
1974 births
Living people
Medalists at the 2006 Winter Paralympics
Medalists at the 2010 Winter Paralympics
Paralympic medalists in cross-country skiing
Paralympic medalists in biathlon
20th-century Russian people
21st-century Russian people